Keep the Customer Satisfied can refer to:

Keep the Customer Satisfied (album), A 1970 big band album by jazz drummer Buddy Rich
"Keep the Customer Satisfied", a song from the Simon & Garfunkel album, Bridge over Troubled Water